The women's 3000 metres steeplechase event at the 2019 European Athletics U23 Championships was held in Gävle, Sweden, at Gavlehof Stadium Park on 11 and 13 July.

Medalists

Results

Heats
Qualification: First 5 in each heat (Q) and next 5 fastest (q) qualified for the final.

Final

References

3000 metres steeplechase
Steeplechase at the European Athletics U23 Championships